Kevin Kiruthi-Kimani (born 12 June 1989) is a Kenyan footballer who plays as a midfielder for Wazito.

Club career
Kimani began his career in Kenya with Kenya Commercial Bank, prior to a spell with Mathare United. Kimani left Kenyan football for Belgian football in 2012 as he joined Belgian Third Division team Bocholter, he participated in eight fixtures for them before leaving in 2013 to sign for Greek Football League club Fostiras. After nine appearances for Fostiras, he left in 2014 to return to Kenya and join Tusker. Short spells with South African team Jomo Cosmos and Kenyan side AFC Leopards followed in 2016 and 2017 respectively. After only a few weeks with AFC Leopards, Kimani joined Saudi First Division side Al-Hazem.

He terminated his contract with Al-Hazem on 4 June 2017. During his time with Al-Hazem, Kimani scored one goal in a First Division win against eventual champions Al-Fayha on 8 April. On 31 January 2018, Kimani joined Sofapaka of the Kenyan Premier League. He scored his first goal for Sofapaka on 28 February during a 2–1 home victory over former team AFC Leopards. Kimani was released in November, having netted three goals in the 2018 season. Kimani rejoined ex-club Mathare United on 5 December. He departed in August 2020, subsequently joining Wazito.

International career
Kimani has represented the Kenyan national team on twenty-one occasions, with his debut coming in 2011 in a 2014 FIFA World Cup qualifier against the Seychelles.

Career statistics
.

Honours

Club
Tusker
KPL Top 8 Cup: 2014

Individual
Kenyan Player of the Year: 2011

References

External links
 

1989 births
Living people
Footballers from Nairobi
Kenyan footballers
Kenyan expatriate footballers
Kenyan expatriate sportspeople in Belgium
Kenyan expatriate sportspeople in Greece
Kenyan expatriate sportspeople in South Africa
Kenyan expatriate sportspeople in Saudi Arabia
Expatriate footballers in Belgium
Expatriate footballers in Greece
Expatriate soccer players in South Africa
Expatriate footballers in Saudi Arabia
Association football midfielders
Kenya international footballers
Kenyan Premier League players
Belgian Third Division players
Football League (Greece) players
South African Premier Division players
Saudi First Division League players
Kenya Commercial Bank S.C. players
Mathare United F.C. players
Fostiras F.C. players
Tusker F.C. players
Jomo Cosmos F.C. players
A.F.C. Leopards players
Al-Hazem F.C. players
Sofapaka F.C. players
Wazito F.C. players